The Greatest Hits – Volume 2: 20 More Good Vibrations is a compilation album of songs by American rock band The Beach Boys, released in 1999 by Capitol Records. It was issued as a companion piece to The Greatest Hits – Volume 1: 20 Good Vibrations, on the same day.

The collection includes early classics that were omitted from the first volume, such as "In My Room" and "Don't Worry Baby", but also covers tracks from their less commercially successful period of 1967-1970, ranging from "Heroes and Villains" to the Al Jardine-produced "Cottonfields", the latter a European hit in the summer of 1970.

As on the first volume, the production credits on this album were revised: although originally credited to The Beach Boys, the songs "Heroes and Villains", "Wild Honey", "Darlin'" and "Friends" are now credited as being produced by Brian Wilson.

In March 2000, The Greatest Hits – Volume 2 charted at No. 192 in the United States, following the broadcast of the ABC TV movie The Beach Boys: An American Family.

Track listing
All songs by Brian Wilson and Mike Love, except where noted.  All tracks are mono single mixes, except where noted.

"In My Room" (Brian Wilson, Gary Usher) – 2:11
"The Warmth of the Sun" – 2:50
"Don't Worry Baby" (Brian Wilson, Roger Christian) – 2:50
"All Summer Long" (mono album mix) – 2:06
"Wendy" – 2:23
"Little Honda" – 1:50
"When I Grow Up (To Be a Man)" – 2:02
"Please Let Me Wonder" – 2:45
"You're So Good to Me" – 2:14
"The Little Girl I Once Knew" – 2:36
"Caroline, No" (Brian Wilson, Tony Asher) – 2:17
 Single version, without passing train/barking dogs coda
"Heroes and Villains" (Brian Wilson, Van Dyke Parks) – 3:37
"Wild Honey" – 2:37
"Darlin'" – 2:12
"Friends" (Brian Wilson, Dennis Wilson, Carl Wilson, Al Jardine) – 2:30
 Single version, mono
"Do It Again" – 2:18
 Single version, without workshop effects coda
"Bluebirds Over the Mountain" (Ersel Hickey) – 2:51
"I Can Hear Music" (stereo single mix) (Jeff Barry, Ellie Greenwich, Phil Spector) – 2:38
"Break Away" (stereo single mix) (Brian Wilson, Reggie Dunbar) – 2:55
 "Reggie Dunbar" is a pseudonym for Murry Wilson
"Cottonfields" (Huddie Ledbetter) – 3:04

References

1999 greatest hits albums
The Beach Boys compilation albums
Capitol Records compilation albums